The 1903 international cricket season was from April 1903 to September 1903.

Season overview

June

Philadelphia in England

September

Kent in Philadelphia

References

International cricket competitions by season
1903 in cricket